Foehn Lake is a small freshwater lake located on a valley on the south skirt of La Bohn Peak, in the far east border of King County, Washington. Foehn Lake is surrounded by prominent peaks and lakes at the heart of the Alpine Lakes Wilderness.

See also 
 List of lakes of the Alpine Lakes Wilderness

References 

Lakes of King County, Washington
Lakes of the Alpine Lakes Wilderness
Okanogan National Forest